This list of recipients of the Bronze Wolf Award includes Scout leaders and public figures who have been awarded the only commendation of the World Scout Committee. The Chief Scout of the World, Lord Baden-Powell, was anxious to avoid a multiplicity of awards, but at the same time he realized that there was a definite need for something to recognize exceptional services to world Scouting.

Since the Bronze Wolf Award was first awarded in 1935, fewer than 400 have been presented. During the first twenty years of the award, only twelve awards were made, in accordance with the International Committee's decision that no more than two awards would normally be made during any two-year period. Under present guidelines, approximately one award for each 2,000,000 members worldwide can be awarded each year. The Bronze Wolf Awards numbered 22, 50, and 84 were withheld, and number 342 was not awarded since the recipient declined the award. The reasons for why the awards were withheld or declined have never been made public.

Recipients

See also

Scouting Round the World

Notes

References

External links
 
 
 

 
Scout and Guide awards